A Short History of The Sudan (تاريخ السودان) (Oxford University Press) is a history book which concerns the development of Sudan from the earliest times until the conclusion of the condominium era and the attainment of independence from Britain in 1956. It concentrates mainly on the political and social aspects of Sudanese history and is intended as an introduction to more detailed study. The author, Mandour Elmahdi, is a Sudanese educator who was the principal of the Institute of Education in Bakht er Ruda at the time the book was published.

Summary 

The book addresses the history of the Sudan up until the nation gained its independence from the United Kingdom in 1956. It is intended to be a general introduction which emphasises social and political patterns within a wider framework of events.

The book is divided into eight chapters:

 The Ancient Sudan
 The Christian Sudan
 The Entry of the Arabs
 The Funj and the Fur
 The Turko-Egyptian Period
 The Mahdiya
 The Condominium Rule
 The Dawn of Independence of the Republic of the Sudan, January 1956

A Short History of The Sudan was reprinted in 1978 and distributed worldwide. It was also used as part of the history syllabus in Sudan for more than 20 years.

References 

1965 non-fiction books
History books about Sudan
Oxford University Press books
Non-fiction books about Sudan